Larix decidua, the European larch, is a species of larch native to the mountains of central Europe, in the Alps and Carpathian Mountains as well as the Pyrenees, with disjunct lowland populations in northern Poland and southern Lithuania. It is widely naturalized in Scandinavia. Its life span has been confirmed to be close to 1000 years  (with claims of up to 2000 years) but is more often around 200 years. It is claimed that one of the larches planted by the second Duke of Atholl at Dunkeld in 1738 is still standing.

Description

Larix decidua is a medium-size to large deciduous coniferous tree reaching 25–45 m tall, with a trunk up to 1 m diameter (exceptionally, to 53.8 m tall and 3.5 m diameter). The crown is conic when young, becoming broad with age; the main branches are level to upswept, with the side branches often pendulous. The shoots are dimorphic, with growth divided into long shoots (typically 10–50 cm long) and bearing several buds, and short shoots only 1–2 mm long with only a single bud. The leaves are needle-like, light green, 2–4 cm long which turn bright yellow before they fall in the autumn, leaving the pale yellow-buff shoots bare until the next spring.

The cones are erect, ovoid-conic, 2–6 cm long, with 10-90 erect or slightly incurved (not reflexed) seed scales; they are green variably flushed red when immature, turning brown and opening to release the seeds when mature, 4–6 months after pollination. The old cones commonly remain on the tree for many years, turning dull grey-black.

It is very cold tolerant, able to survive winter temperatures down to at least -50 °C, and is among the tree line trees in the Alps, reaching 2400 m altitude, though most abundant from 1000–2000 m. It only grows on well-drained soils, avoiding waterlogged ground and is not shade tolerant.

Cultivation
It is thought to have been first cultivated in Britain in 1629. John Evelyn encouraged its wider planting and use. Three successive Dukes of Atholl planted it widely and the fourth Duke wrote "Observations on Larch" in 1807 encouraging further its cultivation, which he practiced on a large scale.

European larch is widely cultivated in southern Canada and the northeastern United States. It has been naturalized in Maine, Michigan, New York, Connecticut, New Hampshire,
Vermont, and Rhode Island. In the northern Appalachian Mountains it is often used for the reforestation of surface mines. European larch can grow on drier soils and tolerate warmer climates than the native tamarack, being better suited to non-boreal climates.

Subtaxa
The following varieties are accepted:
Larix decidua var. carpatica Domin – the Carpathians
Larix decidua var. decidua – European larch or Alpine larch. Most of the range, except as below. Cones 2.5–6 cm; shoots yellow-buff.
Larix decidua var. polonica (Racib. ex Wóycicki) Ostenf. & Syrach – Polish larch. Disjunct in lowland northern Poland. Cones 2–3 cm; shoots very pale yellow-buff, almost white.

Uses
Larix decidua is cultivated as an ornamental tree for planting in gardens and parks.

Wood
The wood is tough and durable, but also flexible in thin strips, and is particularly valued for yacht building; wood used for this must be free of knots, and can only be obtained from old trees that were pruned when young to remove side branches.

Small larch poles are widely used for rustic fencing.

Other
Because of its fast juvenile growth and its pioneer character, larch has found numerous applications in forestry and agroforestry. It is used as a ‘preparatory species’ to afforest open land, abandoned farmland or disturbed land and as a ‘nurse species’ prior to the introduction of more demanding species.

Bonsai
The European larch is a popular bonsai species, with many unique specimens available in European circles, and is popularly used in bonsai forest groups.

Ecology 
The seeds are an important food for some birds, notably siskin, lesser redpoll and citril finch, while the buds and immature cones are eaten by capercaillie.

European larch needles are the only known food for caterpillars of the case-bearer moth Coleophora sibiricella; its cone scales are used as food by the caterpillars of the tortrix moth Cydia illutana.

Invasive species
Larix decidua is classed as a wilding conifer, an invasive species which spreads into the high country of New Zealand. It was planted by the New Zealand Forest Service for erosion control.

Gallery

References

External links

Larix decidua images at the Arnold Arboretum of Harvard University Plant Image Database
Friedman, William (Ned). "Spring larch pilgrimage."Posts from the Collection, Arnold Arboretum of Harvard University, 17 April 2018. Accessed 6 May 2020.
Images of Larix decidua (European larch)
 Larix decidua. Information, genetic conservation units and related resources. European Forest Genetic Resources Programme (EUFORGEN)

decidua
Trees of Europe
Flora of France
Flora of the Alps
Flora of Austria
Flora of the Czech Republic
Flora of Estonia
Flora of Germany
Flora of Italy
Flora of Lithuania
Flora of Poland
Flora of Romania
Flora of Switzerland
Flora of Ukraine
Least concern plants
Trees of humid continental climate
Garden plants of Europe
Ornamental trees
Deciduous conifers
Taxa named by Philip Miller
Flora of the Carpathians